AmeriHealth New Jersey is a provider of health insurance to employers and individuals throughout New Jersey. AmeriHealth New Jersey is headquartered in Cranbury.

AmeriHealth New Jersey offers nationwide coverage through PHCS, a Preferred Provider Organization (PPO). The company offers insurance through AmeriHealth's wellness benefits and incentive programs.

History
AmeriHealth, originally known as Delaware Valley HMO, was established in 1995 to provide health coverage to Pennsylvania employers and their staff residing in Burlington, Camden, Gloucester, and Salem counties of New Jersey. It expanded its coverage area to include southern New Jersey and Delaware, and, by 1997, AmeriHealth offered coverage to the entire state of New Jersey. In 2013 AmeriHealth announced it would be offering plans in New Jersey on the federally run health insurance exchange.

Wellness programs 
AmeriHealth New Jersey is a provider of employer on-site health coaching with a nurse wellness specialist to small- and mid-sized New Jersey-based organizations. Workplace wellness services include sending registered nurses to provide a broad spectrum of on-site health education, seminars, screenings, and support. AmeriHealth New Jersey offers an incentive-based wellness program, called Commit2Wellness Rewards, which provides individuals and groups with tools to "support wellness and rewards for living a healthy lifestyle".

Community involvement
AmeriHealth New Jersey is the name sponsor of the New Jersey Devils’ practice facility, the AmeriHealth Pavilion.  At the time this sponsorship was announced, news reports cited AmeriHealth's desire to contribute to the “revitalization of Newark.”

AmeriHealth New Jersey is also a sponsor and participant in Special Olympics New Jersey's annual “Lincoln Tunnel Challenge.”  In 2009 the event drew a record crowd of 3,500 runners and walkers to the tunnel.  Additionally, AmeriHealth New Jersey sponsors and participates in the Benjamin Franklin Bridge Challenge, which benefits the Larc School for the disabled; and sponsors Rutgers University and several local the minor league baseball teams.

References

Companies based in Middlesex County, New Jersey
Financial services companies established in 1995
Health care companies established in 1995
American companies established in 1995
Cranbury, New Jersey
Health insurance companies of the United States
Health care companies based in New Jersey